LOL (stylized LOL <(^^,)>; LOL is short for "laughing out loud", and <(^^,)> is an emoticon for "satisfied") is the second studio album by the Swedish musician Basshunter, and was released on 28 August 2006 by Warner Music Sweden. An international edition was released on 22 December 2006, with a red version of the cover artwork. The international version includes the original album's Swedish songs (with the exception of "Sverige") with their titles translated into English, a slightly-different track order and additional tracks, including "Jingle Bells".

Background
On 21 November 2005, Basshunter announced that he was working on a new album and had completed ten songs. He announced his upcoming single "Welcome to Rainbow" the following month, and it was released on 1 April 2006. The single included the hardstyle remix and two bonus tracks: "Evil Beat" and "Boten Anna". Basshunter re-recorded "Boten Anna" in March, and posted it on his website for download. He signed with Extensive Music in April, and Warner Music Sweden and "Boten Anna" was released on 9 May.

Basshunter worked on LOL for three-and-a-half weeks. The album was recorded at Basshunter Studio and PJ Harmony Studio. Basshunter produced most of the songs; three were produced by PJ Harmony. Vocals were recorded by Basshunter and Robert Uhlmann at Basshunter Studio and Extensive Studio. LOL was mastered by Björn Engelman at the Cutting Room. Ali Payami assisted Basshunter on three tracks. According to the singer, its songs have elements of hard dance and hard trance and he chose them for his old and new listeners. "Strand Tylösand" is inspired by party that Basshunter and its friends had in the summer of 2005.

Basshunter said that he had more songs and planned to release a continuation of LOL called ROFL or KTHXBYE for free but he couldn't do it due to the record label.

Reception 

According to Matthew Chisling of AllMusic, LOL contains Basshunter's best "beats and grinds". Håkan Steen of Aftonbladet wrote that the album was for people who share Basshunter's lifestyle: using the social-media website LunarStorm and chatting and playing computer games online. Steen considered "Festfolk" the album's best song. Stefan Thungren of Svenska Dagbladet sensed an intentional inadequate execution in the material, and wrote that the sophisticated, difficult shout in "Festfolk" was inspired by the musician E-Type. Thungren compared "Strand Tylösand" to the band Gyllene Tider's summer hits, criticised the trance adaptation of the Swedish national anthem in "Sverige", and noted a certain melancholy in the instrumental version of "Boten Anna". Andreas Nordström from Expressen negatively described album as one of the most difficult records in the history. Basshunter found the Nordström review amusing. In 2020 "I'm Your Basscreator" was placed on list Italian Mob by Italian rap DJ's.

Track listing

Original blue-cover album

Red-cover version 
 "Now You're Gone" (Radio Edit) USA Bonus Track – 2:39
 "DotA" (Radio Edit) – 3:21
 "Boten Anna" – 3:28
 "I'm Your Bass Creator" – 5:24
 "Russia Privjet" – 4:07
 "Professional Party People" – 3:09
 "GPS" – 4:00
 "Hello There" – 2:40
 "We Are the Waccos" – 3:58
 "The Beat" – 3:35
 "Without Stars" – 3:50
 "Throw Your Hands Up" (Basshunter Remix) (Patrik and the Small Guy) – 3:10
 "Strand Tylösand" – 3:17
 "Between the Two of Us" – 3:58
 "Boten Anna" (Instrumental) – 3:20
 "DotA" (Club Mix) – 5:44
 "Jingle Bells (Bass)" – 2:46
 "Beer in the Bar" USA Bonus Track – 3:51

Charts

Weekly charts

Year-end charts

Certifications

Awards

Notes

References

External links
 

2006 albums
Basshunter albums
Ultra Records albums
Warner Music Sweden albums
European Border Breakers Award-winning albums